Petr Jiráček (born 2 March 1986) is a Czech footballer. A midfielder, he operates either as a box-to-box or more in an attacking role.

Career

Clubs 
After starting out at Baník Sokolov, club where he had arrived at 10 years old, and spending two professional seasons there, Jiráček made a move to Viktoria Plzeň. With Viktoria, he made exactly 100 league appearances and was a key part in the team that won the 2010–11 Czech championship, a feat never accomplished before in the history of the club. The title also gave them the opportunity to play the 2011–12 UEFA Champions League, in which they reached the group stage, finishing third only behind giants F.C. Barcelona and A.C. Milan. Jiracek only failed to appear in one match at the European competition. He also won the 2009–10 Czech Cup and the 2011 Czech Supercup.

In December 2011, Jiráček signed a four-and-a-half year deal with German Bundesliga side VfL Wolfsburg. He immediately made an impression as he scored a brace in his fourth league game to secure a 3–2 win against SC Freiburg. He suffered an injury in the end of February, however, that led him to miss a number of matches and be on the bench a few times for the rest of the season.

On 26 August 2012, VfL Wolfsburg head coach Felix Magath confirmed that Jiráček would join Hamburger SV for an undisclosed fee after failing to impress during his stay in Wolfsburg.

National team 
In September 2011, he made a national team debut in a match against Scotland and soon became first choice in the team managed by Michal Bílek. He scored his first goal in a 1–0 win against Montenegro in the Euro 2012 qualifier play-offs.

He went on to play a crucial part in the team that reached the quarterfinals of the UEFA Euro 2012, scoring two goals in the tournament, both opening goals against Greece and Poland in the group stage, being elected the man of the match in the latter match.

International goals
Scores and results list Czech Republic's goal tally first.

Career statistics

Honours 
Viktoria Plzeň
Czech Cup: 2009–10
Czech First League: 2010–11
Czech Supercup: 2011

References

1986 births
Living people
Czech footballers
Czech Republic international footballers
Czech expatriate footballers
FK Baník Sokolov players
FC Viktoria Plzeň players
VfL Wolfsburg players
Hamburger SV players
Czech First League players
Bundesliga players
Expatriate footballers in Germany
UEFA Euro 2012 players
AC Sparta Prague players
People from Sokolov
Association football midfielders
FK Jablonec players
FC Fastav Zlín players
Czech expatriate sportspeople in Germany
Sportspeople from the Karlovy Vary Region
1. SK Prostějov players
Czech National Football League players